The 2018 EuroLeague Final Four was the concluding EuroLeague Final Four tournament of the 2017–18 EuroLeague season, the 61st season of Europe's premier club basketball tournament, and the 18th season since it was organised by Euroleague Basketball. It was the 31st Final Four of the modern EuroLeague Final Four era (1988–present), and the 33rd time overall that the competition had concluded with a final four format. The Final Four was played at the Štark Arena in Belgrade, Serbia, on 18 and 20 May 2018.

Venue
On 26 October 2016 Euroleague Basketball announced that the Final Four would be held in the Štark Arena in Belgrade. It is designed as a universal hall for sports, cultural events and other programs. It was the first time the EuroLeague Final Four was hosted in Belgrade, or in the country of Serbia. The Arena's total floor area is 48,000 square metres. For sports, it has a regular seating capacity for fans of 18,386, and also has 70 luxury boxes, which include a total of 860 seats. The arena's cost was estimated at €70 million. Štark Arena is a member of the European Arenas Association (EAA).

Background

CSKA Moscow
CSKA Moscow finished the regular season as the number one seed, after having a 24–6 record. In the quarter-finals, the team played another Russian side in Khimki. CSKA won the series 3–1 over Khimki, after a controversial 88–89 win in Game 4. In the United League season, CSKA was in second place while battling for the first seed.

Fenerbahçe Doğuş
Fenerbahçe finished second in the regular season and defeated Kirolbet Baskonia in the quarter-finals. Fenerbahçe reached the Final Four for a fourth straight year. Head coach Željko Obradović had the opportunity to win his tenth EuroLeague title, a record for most titles by a coach.

Real Madrid
Madrid battled injuries during the regular season, as Sergio Llull, Ognjen Kuzmić and Rudy Fernández missed most of the games. As a five-seed, the team beat Panathinaikos in a controversial quarterfinal series, 1–3. The star player for Madrid during the season was Luka Dončić, who led the league in Performance Index Rating (PIR), and was later a top-three pick in the 2018 NBA draft. Dončić's games during the Final Four were televised in the United States, by NBA TV.

In the 2017–18 ACB season, Real Madrid was the number one seed.

Žalgiris
In the regular season, Žalgiris qualified as the sixth seed. Žalgiris won the series over favored Olympiacos, 3–1. For EuroLeague Legend Šarūnas Jasikevičius, this was his first visit to the Final Four as a head coach and also for the club since 1999. In its domestic LKL season, the club dominated as well, as it was in a secure first seed.

Bracket

Semifinals

Semifinal A 
Russian champions CSKA Moscow returned to the Final Four to make it their seventh consecutive semi-final appearance. CSKA guard Sergio Rodríguez would play the semi-final against his former club, which he won the EuroLeague title with in 2015, as well as the EuroLeague MVP award in 2014.

Real Madrid would play its fourth Final Four in five years. The match would be a re-match of the 2017 third-place game. During the regular season, both teams won their respective games at home, with this game being considered a Real Madrid home game.

Semifinal B
Defending champions Fenerbahçe Doğuş returned to the Final Four to make it their third straight appearance. Led by head coach Željko Obradović, the all-time record holder for most EuroLeague championships won by a head coach, it defeated Kirolbet Baskonia 1–3 in the quarter-finals, to clinch a semi-final spot.

Žalgiris Kaunas qualified for its first Final Four in 20 years, as the last time the team participated was in 1999, where it claimed the championship as well. The club beat Olympiacos 3–1 in the play-offs, despite not having home court advantage.

Third place game

Championship game

References

External links
Official website

Final
EuroLeague Finals
International sports competitions in Belgrade
International basketball competitions hosted by Serbia
2018 in Serbian sport
2010s in Belgrade
EuroLeague Final Four
Basketball in Belgrade